These are number-one albums of 1954, per Billboard magazine's albums chart.

Chart history through January 16 (no album chart)

Chart history January 23 to end of year

See also
1954 in music

References

1954
Number-one albums of 1954 (U.S.)